Kirby is a city in Bexar County, Texas, United States. It is an enclave of San Antonio and is part of the San Antonio Metropolitan Statistical Area. Founded as an agricultural settlement along the Southern Pacific railroad, the city was transformed into a suburban community upon its incorporation in 1955.  It is known as the "Hobo capital of Texas."

Geography

Kirby is located at  (29.461032, –98.388763).

Demographics

As of the 2020 United States census, there were 8,142 people, 2,858 households, and 1,950 families residing in the city.

As of the census of 2000, there were 8,673 people, 2,975 households, and 2,317 families residing in the city. The population density was 4,641.1 people per square mile (1,790.7/km2). There were 3,137 housing units at an average density of 1,678.7/sq mi (647.7/km2). The racial makeup of the city was 64.27% White, 14.56% African American, 0.53% Native American, 2.06% Asian, 0.14% Pacific Islander, 14.83% from other races, and 3.61% from two or more races. Hispanic or Latino of any race were 41.69% of the population.

There were 2,975 households, out of which 39.2% had children under the age of 18 living with them, 54.1% were married couples living together, 18.4% had a female householder with no husband present, and 22.1% were non-families. 18.1% of all households were made up of individuals, and 5.9% had someone living alone who was 65 years of age or older. The average household size was 2.92 and the average family size was 3.29.

In the city, the population was spread out, with 30.3% under the age of 18, 8.9% from 18 to 24, 29.2% from 25 to 44, 22.6% from 45 to 64, and 9.1% who were 65 years of age or older. The median age was 33 years. For every 100 females, there were 95.7 males. For every 100 females age 18 and over, there were 89.3 males.

The median income for a household in the city was $38,919, and the median income for a family was $42,329. Males had a median income of $28,699 versus $22,086 for females. The per capita income for the city was $15,615. About 8.9% of families and 11.0% of the population were below the poverty line, including 18.1% of those under age 18 and 7.0% of those age 65 or over.

History
Kirby was founded as an agricultural community by German immigrants in the early 1900s. Its name derived from the Kirby yard of the Southern Pacific Railroad that crossed through the town. In 1920 the population was around 18 people, made up of mostly farmers. At this time German was a commonly spoken language.

In the 1950s, the composition of the city shifted from mostly agricultural to military as individuals settled in homes to commute to work at Randolph AFB. The population grew to 600 at this point, and German was less commonly spoken. In 1955 the city was incorporated. A two-year-long drought began in 1957, which ultimately caused many farm failures. Unable to make a profit, the farmers decided to sell their land to the city. Homes and roads were constructed on the purchased land, and the city was further transformed into the suburban area it is today.

Hobo festival
Because of the presence of the railroad and the influx of drifters, Kirby received the nickname "the Hobo capital of Texas." Officials discovered this fact in 2007 and planned for a "Hobo festival."

The city held its first annual "hobo festival" during the first weekend of May 2008, including a "hobo parade" through the streets and the crowning of a hobo King and Queen. Through the years, musical acts such as Wade Hayes and Darrell McCall performed at the event. It continued annually until 2019, when officials cancelled it due to some residents' dislike of the term "hobo."  Other residents have vowed to bring back the festival in the future. The state of the festival has become a political issue in the city.

Government
Kirby is characterized as a "home rule" city as permitted under Texas law. The city can govern itself, and mandate ordinances and actions as long as they do not infringe on state or federal law. The government is set up by the 1988 City Charter that calls for a legislative body of six members (City Council) and a Mayor that heads the legislative body and represents the city. The current mayor is Lisa Pierce. The charter also identifies a city manager to be directed by the council, and accountable for the operation of the city.

Education
Residents of Kirby are zoned to Judson Independent School District.

They are zoned to :
 Hopkins Elementary School
 Kirby Middle School
 Karen Wagner High School

Description
Kirby is located in eastern Bexar County. The northern and southern sections of the city differ both in culture and appearance. The city has a large community sector and much support for the city comes from the public. Kirby takes full advantage of its natural resources found both in the neighborhoods and the agricultural sector alike.

Northern Kirby
The northern section of the city contains the Kirby Manor and Old Town neighborhoods.  It includes Kirby Middle School, Old Seguin Road, FM 78, Gibbs Sprawl Road as well as the Southern Pacific railroad tracks. Because of the railroad tracks, Kirby has been dubbed "The hobo capital of Texas." A consistent population of homeless people live under the 410 overpass.

Southern Kirby

The southern section of the city contains Hopkins Elementary School named after longtime principal Joseph Hopkins. This area of the city is divided between a strictly agricultural sector between Hopkins Elementary and Candlewood Elementary and the homes of the astronaut streets on the other side of Binz Engleman Road. Ackerman is the main road here; it leads to Interstate 10.

Community sector

Kirby is characterized as strictly a suburban area of San Antonio. Kirby has its own fire and police departments. The City Hall is located on Bauman Street.  This is also where Kirby Municipal Court is located. The Police Department and New Fire Station are located on Ackerman Rd.  The city has two parks on both sides of Binz Engleman separated by Ackerman. The western half of the park consists of mostly baseball fields, and the eastern section is accommodated with a full range of recreational activities.

Natural resources

Kirby is a major producer of pecans, which grow naturally in the soil. Pecans produce in large quantities between September and November.  Certain trees do not produce every four years. 1996, 2000, and 2004 were all years with low pecan production.

Rosillo Creek is the main water stream in Kirby.  It once provided the farmers in the agricultural sector with water to irrigate their crops. The creek flows from under the railroad tracks on Gibbs Sprawl Road and further downstream divides Hopkins and Candlewood Elementaries before emptying into Salado Creek in southeastern Bexar County.

Neighborhoods
The neighborhoods of Kirby include Kirby Manor, Old Town, Kirby Terrace, and the Springfield Manor (Astronaut Streets).

Kirby Manor
Kirby Manor is located within Old Seguin Road to its north, Ackerman Road to its east and Binz Engleman Road to its south. The houses of Kirby Manor were built between the 1950s and 1960s. The citizens are a mix of the native settlers in this area and the newer crowd of young people moving in from other San Antonio suburbs and urban areas to start a life. Kirby Manor's proximity to the police station on Ackerman is the main reason why this area has a lower crime rate than the other areas of Kirby.

Old Town
Old Town is located between Old Seguin Road and FM 78. Its eastern and western boundaries include Gibbs Sprawl Road and Kirby Middle School, respectively. This is the area where the first homes of Kirby were built. The area is also where Kirby City Hall is located, the former Kirby Post Office and the old Kirby Fire Department were located. The inhabitants of this area are increasingly becoming younger as the older citizens die off, but there is still a large elderly population.

Springfield Manor
Springfield Manor (Astronaut Streets) is the westernmost section of Kirby. The area is given this name due to the streets, which are named after famous astronauts. This is the newest section of Kirby and has a large population. To its north is FM 78, to its south is Ackerman Road, to its west is Springfield Road and to its east is Binz Engleman Road.

Kirby Terrace
Kirby Terrace is across from Hopkins (formally Kirby) Elementary, bordered on one side by Ackerman Road.

References

Cities in Bexar County, Texas
Cities in Texas
Greater San Antonio
1955 establishments in Texas
Populated places established in 1955
Enclaves in the United States